Edwin J. Anderson (1902–1987) was an American sports executive who held various positions with the Detroit Lions of the National Football League from 1948 to 1987.

Business career
A native of Rockford, Illinois, Anderson attended Beloit College, where he was a member of the school's football and basketball teams. He graduated in 1927 and the following year married Isabel Bort of Chicago. The couple settled in Vincennes, Indiana, where Anderson was an advertising manager for a local newspaper. They moved to Peoria, Illinois, in 1931 after Anderson became an advertising manager for Altorfer Bros. Company. In 1937, Anderson became the general sales manager for James Barclay and Company. The following year he joined the Goebel Brewing Company as vice president and general sales manager. He was promoted to president in 1941 and remained in that role until 1958 when he resigned to focus on his duties with the Lions.

Detroit Lions
Anderson was a member of the Detroit Football Company – a syndicate led by D. Lyle Fife that purchased the Lions from L. Fred Mandel on January 16, 1948. Fife resigned as president during the 1949 season and Anderson was chosen to succeed him. Under Anderson's leadership, the Lions won three NFL championships and four division titles before falling off after the 1957 season. In 1958, he assumed the role of general manager after Nick Kerbawy left to take the same job with the Detroit Pistons of National Basketball Association. In 1961, Anderson resigned as president after a group of stockholders, led by Fife, attempted to remove him. William Clay Ford Sr., an Anderson supporter, was chosen to succeed him and Anderson was allowed to stay on as general manager. The power struggle ended in 1963 when Ford purchased the team from the other shareholders. In 1964, Russ Thomas took over football operations for the Lions, but Anderson remained with the team as a vice president. He was a leading force in the team's move to the Pontiac Silverdome. He remained with the team until his death on February 5, 1987.

References

1902 births
1987 deaths
American advertising people
American brewers
American drink industry businesspeople
American salespeople
Beloit Buccaneers football players
Beloit Buccaneers men's basketball players
Beloit College alumni
Detroit Lions executives
Detroit Lions owners
Sportspeople from Rockford, Illinois